Marwan Abdullah Abdulwahab Noman is a Yemeni diplomat. He quit his position as Ambassador to Japan over the 2011 Yemeni uprising but was denied by the government.

References

Yemeni diplomats
Living people
Ambassadors of Yemen
Year of birth missing (living people)
Place of birth missing (living people)